Hentsch is a surname. Notable people with the surname include: 

Jürgen Hentsch (1936–2011), German actor
Nikolai Hentsch (born 1983), Brazilian alpine skier
Thierry Hentsch (1944–2005), Swiss-Canadian philosopher and political scientist